Baishan Town is a town located in the eastern part of Changping District, Beijing, China. Bounded by part of Taihang Mountain Range in its north, Baishan is located south of Nanshao and Cuicun Towns, west of Xiaotangshan Town, as well as north and east of Shahe Town. Its population was 36,546 as of 2020.

History

Administrative divisions 

As of the time in writing, Baishan Town consists of 15 subdivisions, more specifically 2 communities and 13 villages:

See also 

 List of township-level divisions of Beijing

References 

Changping District
Towns in Beijing